Two Lovers may refer to:

 "The Two Lovers", a narrative poem written by Marie de France
 Two Lovers (1928 film), a drama film
 Two Lovers (2008 film), a romantic drama film
 "Two Lovers" (Mary Wells song), a 1962 single by Mary Wells
 "Two Lovers" (The Twang song), a 2007 rock single by The Twang
 The Lovers (Abbasi), 17th-century painting by Reza Abbasi (also known as Two Lovers)
 "Two Lovers and a Beachcomber by the Real Sea", a 1955 poem by Sylvia Plath whose title is sometimes abbreviated as "Two Lovers"

See also
Two Loves (disambiguation)
My Two Loves
Two Lovers Point in Guam